Luiz Eduardo Felix da Costa, known as Luiz Eduardo (born 28 April 1993) is a Brazilian footballer who plays for Luverdense as a central defender.

Career
He made his professional debut in the Campeonato Paulista for São Paulo on 30 January 2011 in a game against Santos.

References

External links
Profile at São Paulo's website 

1993 births
Footballers from São Paulo (state)
Living people
Brazilian footballers
Brazilian expatriate footballers
São Paulo FC players
Clube Náutico Capibaribe players
Comercial Futebol Clube (Ribeirão Preto) players
Boa Esporte Clube players
Rio Claro Futebol Clube players
Esporte Clube Juventude players
Gil Vicente F.C. players
Associação Portuguesa de Desportos players
Luverdense Esporte Clube players
Campeonato Brasileiro Série A players
Campeonato Brasileiro Série B players
Campeonato Brasileiro Série C players
Liga Portugal 2 players
Association football defenders
Brazilian expatriate sportspeople in Portugal
Expatriate footballers in Portugal